Kenneth Williams (born 27 January 1968) is a Trinidadian cricketer. He played in 24 first-class and 17 List A matches for Trinidad and Tobago from 1983 to 1984.

See also
 List of Trinidadian representative cricketers

References

External links
 

1968 births
Living people
Trinidad and Tobago cricketers